Miss Vietnam 2012 (Vietnamese: Hoa hậu Việt Nam 2012) was the 13th edition of the Miss Vietnam pageant. It was held on August 25, 2012 at Tiên Sơn Sports Complex, Da Nang, Vietnam. Miss Vietnam 2010 Đặng Thị Ngọc Hân crowned her successor Đặng Thu Thảo at the end of the event.

Results

Placements 
 Color keys

Special Awards

Contestants 
40 contestants in the final.

References 

Beauty pageants in Vietnam
2012 beauty pageants
Vietnamese awards